Leatherheads is a 2008 American sports comedy film from Universal Pictures directed by and starring George Clooney. The film also stars Renée Zellweger, Jonathan Pryce, and John Krasinski and focuses on the early years of professional American football. The film was released on April 4, 2008. It received mixed reviews from critics and grossed just $41 million against its $58 million budget.

Plot
In 1925, Jimmy "Dodge" Connelly (George Clooney) is captain of the Duluth Bulldogs, a struggling professional American football team.  Dodge is determined to save both his team and pro football in general when the players lose their sponsor and the league is on the brink of collapse. He convinces Princeton University's college football star, Carter "the Bullet" Rutherford, to join the Bulldogs, hoping to capitalize on Carter's fame as a decorated hero of the First World War (like Alvin York, he single-handedly captured a large group of German soldiers).  In addition to his legendary tales of combat heroism, Carter has dashing good looks and unparalleled speed and skill on the field.  As a result of his presence, both the Bulldogs and pro football in general begin to prosper.

Chicago Tribune newspaper reporter Lexie Littleton becomes the object of the affections of both Dodge and Carter. Lexie has been assigned to find proof that Carter's war heroics are bogus. Carter confesses that the surrender of the Germans was a lucky accident and that his role in it was more foolish than heroic. Carter soon discovers Lexie's agenda and is doubly hurt when he learns that Dodge and Lexie are starting to show affections for each other and even shared a kiss. The ensuing fight over Lexie's affections puts her off. Spurred on by the threats of Carter's manager, she decides to publish the story.

The story sparks a firestorm of accusations and reprimands. Carter's manager resorts to shady dealing to cover it up, even bribing the original witness to change his story.

Dodge's attempts to legitimize pro football take on a life of their own. The new commissioner of football appointed by the US Congress, formalizes the game's rules, taking away improvisational antics. In addition, the commissioner takes the responsibility of clearing up the Carter controversy to set an example for the new direction of professional football.

With the whole world against Lexie (even the Tribune is pushing her to retract her story), Dodge concocts a clever ruse. Interrupting a private hearing in the commissioner's office, Dodge threatens Carter with a confrontation by his old army mates. Dodge claims that they are just outside the door, ready to congratulate him for his heroic actions. In truth, the men are Bulldogs in borrowed Army uniforms.

Carter confesses the truth. The commissioner frees Lexie from printing a retraction. Carter is ordered to simply say he got too much credit for his war actions, but must give a hefty part of his paycheck to the American Legion. Carter's conniving manager is banned from football as well. Dodge is warned that if he pulls any old tricks to win the next game, he will lose his place in the league.

Dodge plays in one last game. This time it will be against Carter, who has changed sides from Duluth to Chicago. The rivalry for Lexie's affection spills onto the field.

The game does not go well for Dodge, including how muddy the field is. Dodge decides football should be played without rules. Lexie notices that after a brawl, Dodge is missing and with most players covered in mud, no one can tell who is who. There appears to be an interception and Chicago seems to have won, but when the mud is removed it is seen that the player is none other than Dodge Connelly, who disguised himself as a Chicago player on the play. The play is changed from an interception to a touchdown, and the Bulldogs win.

Carter tells Dodge that Dodge is finished playing football, based on the threat the commissioner had made. He intends to tell the newspapers the real story about his "capture" of the German soldiers. Dodge argues that America "needs" heroes and it is implied the true story will not be told. Dodge and Carter part on good terms once again.

After the game, Dodge meets up with Lexie and they ride into the sunset on Dodge's motorbike, discussing with humor the possibilities in their future, which include bankruptcy, scandals and jail time.  During the end credits, pictures show Dodge and Lexie getting married, Carter donating $10,000 to the US military and Carter's former manager with new clients Babe Ruth and Lou Gehrig.

Real-life basis
In an interview on the Late Show with David Letterman, Clooney mentioned the plot is loosely based on George Halas's signing of University of Illinois football star Harold "Red" Grange.  Grange was signed to a contract with the Chicago Bears in 1925, the day after his final game at Illinois.

The team itself is loosely based on the Duluth Eskimos. Clooney later explained that "We wanted to call them the Eskimos, but because we were drinking in the movie, the NFL said we couldn't use the actual names." The Canton Bulldogs was the first successful pro football team, which is why the Professional Football Hall of Fame is located in Canton, Ohio.

Cast

Production
Leatherheads began filming on February 12, 2007. Filming locations mainly included locations in Chattanooga, Tennessee, upstate South Carolina around Anderson, Greenville, Ware Shoals, Greer and Travelers Rest, as well as Boiling Springs  and western North Carolina around Statesville, Greensboro and Winston-Salem, specifically at Hanes Middle School and the Winston-Salem Millennium Center. Additional train scenes were filmed in the Winston-Salem suburb of Tobaccoville, specifically in the community of Donnaha.

The crew and cast headquarters during the Winston-Salem scenes were based in the nearby town of East Bend, in Yadkin County, North Carolina. The football game scenes at the beginning and at the end of the picture were filmed at Memorial Stadium, near Central Piedmont Community College in Charlotte, North Carolina, with technical advisor T.J. Troup "teaching them the intricacies of 1920s football so that they look and sound like real players of the era."

Train scenes were filmed at the North Carolina Transportation Museum in Spencer, North Carolina  and The Tennessee Valley Railroad Museum in Chattanooga, TN. Filming wrapped in mid-May 2007. After initially being set for release in December 2007, the studio moved the release date to April 4, 2008.

On March 24, George Clooney and Renée Zellweger premiered the film in Maysville, Kentucky, birthplace of Clooney's father and aunt, Nick Clooney and Rosemary Clooney. Clooney and Zellweger visited Duluth to promote the film.

The piano player bent over the tack piano with eyes glued to music is the composer of the original music in this film, Oscar-winning songwriter Randy Newman. The George and Ira Gershwin song "The Man I Love" is sung in the film but the song was not extant in 1925. It was "part of the 1927 score for the Gershwin antiwar musical satire Strike Up the Band".

Reception

Box office
In its opening weekend, the film grossed $12.6 million in 2,769 theaters in the United States and Canada, ranking No. 3 at the box office behind the second weekend of 21 and fellow newcomer Nim's Island, below the expectations of Universal Studios. Viewers in their 50s to 80s were the main audience for the film. As of October 2013, the movie had made about $31.2 million from the United States and Canada and $10.1 million from other markets making a global total of
$41.3 million. The budget for the film was $58 million.

Critical response
On Rotten Tomatoes, the film has an approval rating of 52% based on 170 reviews, with an average rating of 5.81/10. The website's critics consensus reads: "Despite a good premise and strong cast, this pro football romcom is half screwball and half fumble." On Metacritic, the film has a weighted average score of 56 out of 100, based on 34 critics, indicating "mixed or average reviews". Audiences surveyed by CinemaScore gave the film an average grade of "C+" on scale of A+ to F.

Peter Travers of Rolling Stone wrote: "Leatherheads is most on its game when it's in the game, and in the zone of Clooney's no-bull affection for the faces of his actors."
Kirk Honeycutt of The Hollywood Reporter wrote: "Clooney, the film's director and star, can't make up his mind how to approach the story. One minute it's a romantic comedy. Then it switches to slapstick, then to screwball comedy before sliding into Frank Capra territory."
Todd McCarthy of Variety wrote: "Arch and funny in equal measure, this looks like a theatrical non-starter that Clooney fans and football devotees might be tempted to check out down the line on DVD or on the tube."

Writing credits
In 2007, a Writers Guild of America arbitration vote decided not to award Clooney a screen credit for the film, preferring to credit only the original writers, longtime Sports Illustrated columnist Rick Reilly and his former magazine colleague, Duncan Brantley. In response to the WGA's ruling, Clooney resigned his full WGA status to go "financial core" within the guild, meaning that while still technically a member, he only has limited rights. While he did not contest the ruling of the WGA, Clooney said that he did not want to exclude Brantley and Reilly, agreeing that they deserved the first position credit for their work, but felt that his "major overhaul" of the 17-year-old script to turn it into a screwball comedy left only two of the original scenes intact.

Co-producer Grant Heslov stated that he thought the guild "made the wrong decision," saying, "This script that Duncan and Rick wrote sat languid until after we finished Good Night, and Good Luck... George liked Leatherheads but said it never felt quite right. He took it to Italy with him, and I remember when he called to say he thought he'd solved it. One thing that you clearly see, if you read the original, the subsequent drafts and then his draft, is that he wrote the majority of the film... We both thought Duncan and Rick would get first position credit, which they deserved. But this wasn't right."

Paul Attanasio also did uncredited re-writes on the film prior to Clooney taking over.

References

External links
 
 
 

Films directed by George Clooney
2008 films
American football films
American romantic comedy films
2008 romantic comedy films
American sports comedy films
Films scored by Randy Newman
Films set in the 1920s
Films set in Chicago
Films set in Minnesota
Films shot in North Carolina
Films shot in South Carolina
Films shot in Tennessee
Universal Pictures films
Smokehouse Pictures films
Films produced by Grant Heslov
Films with screenplays by George Clooney
Films produced by George Clooney
Films produced by Sydney Pollack
2000s English-language films
2000s American films